Lee Tae-hwan (born February 21, 1995) is a South Korean actor, model and singer. Since his acting debut in 2013, he has starred in television dramas and web series, notably Pride and Prejudice (2014)  and W. He is a member of 5urprise.

Career 
In 2013, at the age of eighteen, Lee Tae-hwan made his official acting debut in the short TV series titled After School: Lucky or Not together with the members of 5urprise. He next starred in High School King of Savvy, portraying an ice hockey player; and also played the younger version of Lee Deok-wa in the 2-episode SBS drama Wonderful Day in October.

In 2014, Lee starred in MBC drama Pride and Prejudice, where he played an investigator and former taekwondo athlete.
Lee's then starred in his first period drama, Splendid Politics in which he played young Prince Gwanghae.

In 2016, Lee became known for his role in Please Come Back, Mister, where he played a former gangster and bodyguard. He next starred in MBC fantasy thriller W, playing a martial arts instructor. The same year, he was cast in the Korean-Chinese web-drama Thumping Spike, where he played a volleyball captain. Lee also made his big screen debut in the Su Saek, a film depicting about the friendship among young men.

From 2016 to 2017, Lee was cast in MBC's weekend drama Father, I'll Take Care of You, a 50-episode family drama in which he portrayed one of the unmarried sons. He then starred in another weekend drama My Golden Life from 2017 to 2018, playing an industrial design student. The drama was a hit with over 40% ratings, and led to a rise in popularity for Lee.

In 2018, Lee was cast in tvN's romantic comedy drama What's Wrong with Secretary Kim, playing a famous author.

In 2019, Lee starred in SBS youth drama Farmers' Academy, playing a first year student at the Department of Food crops.

Personal life

Military service 
On June 21, 2022, Lee's agency announced that he will enlist for the mandatory military service on June 27 without disclosing the location and time.

Filmography

Film

Television series

Web series

Television shows

Web shows

Awards and nominations

References

External links 
 
 
 

1995 births
Living people
South Korean male television actors
South Korean male film actors
South Korean male idols
Hanlim Multi Art School alumni
21st-century South Korean male singers